Michael Goldie (26 February 1932, Edmonton, London – 17 June 2013, France) was a British character actor active between 1963 and 1996.

He starred or appeared in numerous television serials including Coronation Street (as Bob Statham, owner of the Weatherfield Recorder, 1987/88), Doctor Who (in the serials The Dalek Invasion of Earth and The Wheel in Space), Wycliffe, Inspector Morse, The Bill and Z-Cars. His films included Doctor in Distress (1963), Where the Bullets Fly (1966), The Body Stealers (1969), The Horror of Frankenstein (1970), The Pied Piper (1972), Lady Jane (1986) and Robin Hood: Prince of Thieves (1991).

His stage work included various roles with the Royal Shakespeare Company.

Filmography

References

External links

Michael Goldie at Theatricalia

British male television actors
1932 births
2013 deaths